The  Bloomington Extreme season was the team's sixth season as a professional indoor football franchise and third in the Indoor Football League (IFL). One of twenty-two teams competing in the IFL for the 2011 season, the Bloomington, Illinois-based Bloomington Extreme were members of the Great Lakes Division of the United Conference.

Under the leadership of owner Ed Brady, and head coach Mike Murray, the team played their home games at the U.S. Cellular Coliseum in Bloomington, Illinois.

Schedule
Key:

Preseason

Regular season

Postseason

Roster

Standings

References

Bloomington Extreme
Bloomington Edge seasons
Bloomington Extreme